PWX may refer to:

Premiere Wrestling Xperience
Pro Wrestling eXpress
Providence and Worcester Railroad (NASDAQ ticker: PWX)
PWX, the first radio station in Cuba; see  History of broadcasting
Space weather experiment PWx, aboard the satellite Demonstration and Science Experiments

See also

 PW (disambiguation)
 WX (disambiguation)
 PX (disambiguation)